Rohan Bopanna and  Florin Mergea were the defending champions, but Bopanna chose to compete in s'Hertogenbosch instead. Mergea played alongside Horia Tecău, but lost in the semifinals to Marcus Daniell and Artem Sitak.

Daniell and Sitak went on to win the title, defeating Oliver Marach and Fabrice Martin in the final, 6–7(4–7), 6–4, [10–8].

Seeds

Draw

Draw

References

External links
 Main draw

Stuttgart Open – Doubles
Doubles 2016